Jaider Villa Giraldo (born 30 January 1977), better known as Jaider Villa, is a Colombian actor, host and model. He began his acting career in a reality show called Protagonistas de Novela in 2002, in which he emerged as the winner. He has appeared in many TV soap operas, for example Al ritmo de tu corazón in which he played Santiago Duque (a leading role); Milagros de Amor, Corazón valiente and others. In 2014 he won the recognition of Miami Mayor Tomas Pedro Regalado for his contribution to the art featured in the work "Mesalina" in the leading role as John.
He has done many advertising campaigns for many varied brands such as Coca-Cola, Dish Network, Ford, hhgreg, Lowe's and others.

Commercials

Theater

References

External links 
 
 Jaider Vila on Colarte
 
 El Nuevo Herald
 diario broward "Nudos" play-acting
 El tiempo Jaider Villa 12 years after "Protagonistas de novela
 Recognition of the mayor of Miami la vallenata
 Recognition of the mayor of Miami Terra
 Recognition of the mayor of Miami Lafiscalia.com
 Recognition of the mayor of Miami Vanguardia
 el tiempo recuperacion
 entrevista
 Recognition of the mayor of Miami disqus
 de actor desempleado a galan
 Recognition of the mayor of Miami CanalRCN

Colombian male telenovela actors
1977 births
Living people
21st-century Colombian male actors
Colombian male television actors
Colombian male film actors
People from Medellín
Colombian people of Spanish descent
Colombian people of Italian descent